Lamar County Comprehensive High School is a public high school located in Barnesville, Georgia, United States. The school is part of the Lamar County School District, which serves Lamar County.

Academics
As reported by the Georgia Department of Education, Lamar County High was designated a Title 1 Award School for Highest Progress in 2012 and 2015. This distinction is for high levels of progress for all students during the past three years and is only awarded to the top 10% of Title 1 Schools in the state.

Members of the high school faculty were named System Teacher of the Year for two consecutive years in 2012 and 2013.

Literary Award - First Place Region, 2012; two students took 2nd place at State, 2012

Academic Team - Second Place GATA State Varsity, 2013, Third Place GATA Junior Varsity, 2013

JROTC - The JROTC unit has maintained for three years its Honors with Distinction designation, and in 2011-2012 was the only JROTC unit from the State of Georgia to be selected to attend the national academic bowl in Washington, DC.

Arts and sciences

Science Fair Award - two Regional First Place awards, 2012

Concert Band - Excellent Rating, GMEA Festival, 2011 and 2012; Superior Rating, Shamrock Festival, 2013

Marching Band - Outstanding Performance Award, Fort Valley State University Marching Jamboree, 2011; Most Outstanding Student Woodwind Award, Southern University Summer Band Camp, 2012; Overall Best Camper Student Award, Southern University Summer Band Camp, 2012; Majorettes, First Place, Alabama State University Band Camp, 2012; Flag Line, Division Second Place, Alabama State University Band Camp, 2012

Choral - two students chosen for the 2013 Georgia All-State Chorus and 2013 NafME All National Honor Ensemble

Athletics
Coaching - Athletic Director Calvin Scandrett, was AD of the year in Region AA, 2012.

Soccer - boys' and girls' soccer teams qualified for state playoffs, 2012

Baseball - boys' baseball qualified for state playoff, 2012

Tennis - girls' tennis team qualified for state playoffs, 2012; boys' tennis team was regional runner-up, 2012

JROTC Drill Team - qualified for state competition 2012

JROTC Color Guard - qualified for state competition 2012

Cross country - qualified for state competition, 2011 and 2012; Student individual First Place Region AA, 2011; Student individual medal, Footlocker South Regionals, 2012; Student individual selected for All Middle Georgia Cross Country Team, 2012; Ten  Individual students won All Region Cross Country, 2011 and 2012

Track - Region 4AA Boys' Track Champion, 2012; Boys' 4x100 State AA Champions

Volleyball - The four-year-old women's volleyball team advanced to state playoffs for the first time, 2013-2014

Football - Region 4AA Champion Varsity Football and State Semi-Finalist, 2012

Football - The Trojans football team played their first game on  Saturday, September 5, 1970, beating Morrow High School 6–0.

References

External links
 
 Lamar County Comprehensive High School
 Lamar County School Board

Schools in Lamar County, Georgia
Public high schools in Georgia (U.S. state)